Channa is a genus of predatory fish in the family Channidae, commonly known as snakeheads, native to freshwater habitats in Asia. This genus contains about 50 scientifically described species. The genus has a wide natural distribution extending from Iraq in the west, to Indonesia and China in the east, and parts of Siberia in the Far East. A particularly high richness of species exists in Myanmar (Burma) and northeastern India, and many Channa species live nowhere else. In contrast, a few widespread species have been introduced to several regions outside their natural range, where they often become invasive. The large and medium-sized Channa species are among the most common staple food fish in several Asian countries, and they are extensively cultured. Apart from their importance as a food fish, snakeheads are consumed in some regions as a traditional medicine for wound healing and reducing postoperative pain and discomfort, and collected for the international aquarium pet trade.

All snakeheads are highly predatory, and the diets of the various species of Channa include fish, amphibians (like frogs), snakes, rodents, birds, and invertebrates (insects and crustaceans). They have a labyrinth organ, which allows them to breathe air for short periods, and they use this adaptation to travel across land in the event that their habitat becomes inhospitable. They are mostly solitary or live in monogamous pairs that are highly aggressive towards outsiders of their own species, but C. pleurophthalma often occurs in small groups. Larger species are mostly nestbrooding (making a nest of vegetation at the water surface), and the dwarfs mostly paternal mouthbrooding, but exceptions occur; the large C. barca is a paternal mouthbrooder and the dwarf C. bleheri is a free-spawner (the eggs float to the surface where the parents take care of them, but they do not mouthbrood or built a nest).

Taxonomy
The taxonomy of the genus Channa is incomplete, and a comprehensive revision of the family has not been performed. A phylogenetic study in 2010 has indicated the likelihood of the existence of undescribed species of channids in Southeast Asia, and a more comprehensive phylogenetic study in 2017 indicated that several undescribed species exist in Asia (as well as an undescribed Parachanna in Africa). In 2011, the Malabar snakehead Channa diplogramma from peninsular India was shown to be a distinct species, 146 years after its initial description and 134 years after it was synonymised with C. micropeltes, establishing it is an endemic species of peninsular India. The study also suggested that the species shared a most recent common ancestor with C. micropeltes, around 9.52 to 21.76 MYA.

Species

Currently, 51 recognized species are placed in this genus:

 Channa amari Dey et al., 2019
 Channa amphibeus (McClelland, 1845) (Borna snakehead)
 Channa andrao Britz, 2013
 Channa argus (Cantor, 1842) (northern snakehead)
Channa aristonei 
 Channa asiatica (Linnaeus, 1758) (small snakehead)
 Channa aurantimaculata Musikasinthorn, 2000  (orange-spotted snakehead)
 Channa aurantipectoralis Lalhlimpuia, Lalronunga & Lalramliana, 2016
 Channa auroflammea Adamson, Britz and S. Lieng, 2019
 Channa aurolineata (F. Day, 1870)
 Channa bankanensis (Bleeker, 1853) 
 Channa baramensis (Steindachner, 1901) 
 Channa barca (F. Hamilton, 1822) (barca snakehead)
 Channa bipuli Praveenraj, Uma, Moulitharan & Bleher, 2018
 Channa bleheri Vierke, 1991 (rainbow snakehead)
 Channa brahmacharyi Chakraborty, Yardi & Mukherjee, 2020 
Channa brunnea Praveenraj, Uma, Moulitharan & Kannan, 2019
 Channa burmanica B. L. Chaudhuri, 1919 
 Channa cyanospilos (Bleeker, 1853) 
 Channa diplogramma (F. Day, 1865) (Malabar snakehead)
 Channa gachua (F. Hamilton, 1822) (dwarf snakehead)
 Channa harcourtbutleri (Annandale, 1918) (Burmese snakehead)
 Channa hoaluensis Nguyen, 2011
 Channa kelaartii (Günther, 1861)
 Channa limbata (Cuvier, 1831)
 Channa lipor Praveenraj, Uma, Moulitharan & Singh, 2019
 Channa longistomata (Nguyen & Nguyen, 2012)
 Channa lucius (G. Cuvier, 1831) (forest snakehead)
 Channa maculata (Lacépède, 1801) (blotched snakehead)
 Channa marulioides (Bleeker, 1851) (emperor snakehead)
 Channa marulius (F. Hamilton, 1822) (great snakehead)
 Channa melanoptera (Bleeker, 1855)
 Channa melanostigma Geetakumari & Vishwanath, 2011
 Channa melasoma (Bleeker, 1851) (black snakehead)
 Channa micropeltes (G. Cuvier, 1831) (giant snakehead)
 Channa ninhbinhensis V. H. Nguyễn, 2011
 Channa nox C. G. Zhang, Musikasinthorn & Watanabe, 2002 (night snakehead)
 Channa orientalis Bloch & J. G. Schneider, 1801 (Ceylon snakehead)
 Channa ornatipinnis Britz, 2008
 Channa panaw Musikasinthorn, 1998 (Panaw snakehead)
 Channa pardalis Knight, 2016
 Channa pleurophthalma (Bleeker, 1851)
 Channa pomanensis Gurumayum & Tamang, 2016
 Channa pseudomarulius (Günther, 1861)
 Channa pulchra Britz, 2007
 Channa punctata (Bloch, 1793) (spotted snakehead)
 Channa quinquefasciata Praveenraj et al., 2018
Channa rara Britz et al., 2019
Channa royi Praveenraj et al., 2018  (Andaman emerald snakehead) — likely a synonym of C. harcourtbutleri
 Channa shingon M. Endruweit, 2017)
 Channa stewartii (Playfair (fr), 1867) (Assamese snakehead)
 Channa stiktos Lalramliana, Knight, Lalhlimpuia & Singh, 2018
 Channa striata (Bloch, 1793) (striped snakehead)
 Channa torsaensis Dey, Nur, Raychowdhury, Sarkar, Singh & Barat, 2018 (cobalt blue snakehead)

References

 
Channidae
Fish of Asia
Freshwater fish genera
Taxa named by Giovanni Antonio Scopoli